The BMW 6012 (later MTU 6012) was a German turboshaft and gas generator engine. Designed in the late-1950s by BMW the engine powered the Dornier Do 32 helicopter and was also used as an auxiliary power unit (APU).

Applications
 Dornier Do 32
Dornier Do 32K

Specifications

See also

References

Notes

6012
1960s turboshaft engines
Aircraft gas generator engines